Filippo Sgarlata (24 November 1901 – 15 September 1979) was an Italian sculptor. His work was part of the sculpture event in the art competition at the 1948 Summer Olympics.

References

1901 births
1979 deaths
20th-century Italian sculptors
20th-century Italian male artists
Italian male sculptors
Olympic competitors in art competitions
People from Tunis